Megalodes is a genus of bird dropping moths in the family Noctuidae. This genus has a single species, Megalodes eximia.

References

Hadeninae